Panticapaeum (from Scythian , "fish-path") was an ancient Greek city on the eastern shore of Crimea, which the Greeks called Taurica. The city lay on the western side of the Cimmerian Bosporus, and was founded by Milesians in the late 7th or early 6th century BC, on a hill later named Mount Mithridat. Its ruins now lie in the modern city of Kerch.

Early existence

During the first centuries of the city's existence, imported Greek articles predominated: pottery (see Kerch Style), terracottas, and metal objects, probably from workshops in Rhodes, Corinth, Samos, and Athens. Local production, imitated from the models, was carried on at the same time. Athens manufactured a special type of bowl for the city, known as Kerch ware. Local potters imitated the Hellenistic bowls known as the Gnathia style as well as relief wares—Megarian bowls. The city minted silver coins from the 5th century BC and gold and bronze coins from the 4th century BC. At its greatest extent it occupied . The Hermitage and Kerch Museums contain material from the site, which is still being excavated.

Fifth to first centuries BC
In the 5th–4th centuries BC, the city became the residence first of the Archaeanactids and then of the Spartocids, dynasties of Thracian kings of Bosporus, and was hence itself sometimes called Bosporus. Its economic decline in the 4th–3rd centuries BC was the result of the Sarmatian conquest of the steppes and the growing competition of Egyptian grain.

Mithridates

The last of the Spartocids, Paerisades V, apparently left his realm to Mithridates VI Eupator, king of Pontus. This transition was arranged by one of Mithridates's generals, Diophantus, who earlier had been sent to Taurica to help local Greek cities against Palacus of the Scythian kingdom in Crimea. The mission did not go smoothly: Paerisades was murdered by Scythians led by Saumacus, and Diophantus escaped to return later with reinforcements to suppress the revolt (c. 110 BC).

Half of a century later, Mithridates took his life in Panticapaeum, when, after his defeat in a war against Rome, his son and heir Pharnaces and citizens of Panticapaeum turned against him.

References

Further reading

External links

Perseus Digital Library
Iconicarchive Photo Gallery
Decree honoring Diophantos, general of the Pontic king Mithridates VI
Similarities between Panticapaeum and the City of Atlantis as described by Plato. Eagle/Wind 2005

Bosporan Kingdom
Milesian colonies in Crimea
Kerch Peninsula
Kerch
Populated places established in the 1st millennium BC
Archaeological sites in Ukraine
Cultural heritage monuments of federal significance in Crimea